The Language Acquisition Device (LAD) is a claim from language acquisition research proposed by Noam Chomsky in the 1960s. The LAD concept is a purported instinctive mental capacity which enables an infant to acquire and produce language. It is a component of the nativist theory of language. This theory asserts that humans are born with the instinct or "innate facility" for acquiring language. The main argument given in favor of the LAD was the argument from the poverty of the stimulus, which argues that unless children have significant innate knowledge of grammar, they would not be able to learn language as quickly as they do, given that they never have access to negative evidence and rarely receive direct instruction in their first language.

A summary explaining LAD by Chomsky states that languages are infinite pertaining to the sequence of word forms (strings) and grammar. These word forms organize grammatically correct sequences of words that can be pooled over a limited lexicon of each independent language. So, LAD is tasked to select from an infinite number of grammars the one which is correct for the language that is presented to an individual, for example, a child.

Criticism 
Critics say there is insufficient evidence from neuroscience and language acquisition research to support the claim that people have a language acquisition device as described above, and for the related ideas universal grammar and poverty of the stimulus. It is also argued that Chomsky's purported linguistic evidence for them was mistaken.

For such reasons, the mainstream language acquisition community rejected generative grammar in the beginning of the 21st century. The search for a language acquisition device continues, but some scholars argue it is pseudoscience.

See also
 Nicaraguan sign language

References

Sources
 
 
 
 

Noam Chomsky
Language acquisition